Giuseppe Mazzanti (born 5 April 1983) is an Italian baseball player who competed in the 2004 Summer Olympics, 2009 World Baseball Classic, and 2019 European Baseball Championship. Mazzanti also had a brief stint with the minor league AZL Mariners of the Seattle Mariners franchise. Mazzanti has had most of his success in the Italian Baseball League where he was named MVP both in 2007 and 2008.

As a member of Italy national baseball team he won 2010 European Baseball Championship. He played for Team Italy in the 2019 European Baseball Championship. He is playing for the team at the Africa/Europe 2020 Olympic Qualification tournament, taking place in Italy beginning September 18, 2019.

References

1983 births
2016 European Baseball Championship players
Arizona League Mariners players
Baseball players at the 2004 Summer Olympics
Italian expatriate baseball players in the United States
Living people
Nettuno Baseball Club players
Olympic baseball players of Italy
2019 European Baseball Championship players